Joseph Kuntschen (12 November 1849 – 16 April 1928) was a Swiss politician and President of the Swiss National Council (1910/1911).

External links 
 
 

1849 births
1928 deaths
Members of the National Council (Switzerland)
Presidents of the National Council (Switzerland)